Ola Salo (born Rolf Ola Anders Svensson; 19 February 1977) is a Swedish rock musician, and the lead vocalist of Swedish glam rock band The Ark.

Early life
He lived in Rottne, Växjö Municipality, in Sweden when he was a child, where, in 1991, he and his friends Jepson and Leari officially started the band The Ark.

Career
Salo and the other members of the band had an international breakthrough in 2000 with the album We Are The Ark, containing the signature song "It Takes a Fool to Remain Sane" (for which Ola won a Grammis for "Song of the Year"), a song Salo wrote after watching the Danish film Idioterne (The Idiots). 

In October 2006 during a party celebrating the new Swedish embassy in Washington, D.C., The Ark was performing on stage. As a plane was flying very low overhead Salo said "In this country, you don't know where those planes are headed. Well, this one seems to be heading in the right direction anyway..." meaning the airport, but then suddenly adding "...to the White House" which happened to be in the same direction.

This caused controversy as many newspapers reported that Salo had "wished an airplane to crash into the White House". Salo later said that it was a bad joke, "totally unserious way of being cheeky toward the White House" and not a political statement. The band ended up cancelling almost its entire U.S. tour.

On 10 March 2007, Salo and the band The Ark won Melodifestivalen 2007 and went on to represent Sweden in the Eurovision Song Contest 2007 with the song "The Worrying Kind", where, in which they came 18th with 51 points.

In 2008, Salo translated Andrew Lloyd Webber's Jesus Christ Superstar into Swedish for a performance in Malmö where he played the role of Jesus, and as a result he stated that "2008 will be a very quiet year" for The Ark after a hectic 2007 with the Eurovision Song Contest and the release of Prayer for the Weekend. In 2009. Salo featured on the Empire Dogs' album, Come On You Preachers. In 2018, he participated in the first season of Stjärnornas stjärna on TV4.

In 2019, Salo opened his headline residency It takes a fool to remain sane in the Rondo, (Gothenburg), directed by Edward af Sillén.

Personal life
Salo is openly bisexual.

Discography

Albums

References

External links

1977 births
Bisexual men
Bisexual singers
Eurovision Song Contest entrants of 2007
Swedish LGBT singers
Living people
People from Växjö
Swedish male musicians
Eurovision Song Contest entrants for Sweden
English-language singers from Sweden
The Ark (Swedish band) members
Melodifestivalen contestants of 2007
Melodifestivalen contestants of 2006